John Caven (born 6 July 1934) was a Scottish professional football outside left who played in the Football League for Brentford. He began his career in Scotland with Kilmarnock.

Club career

Kilmarnock 
Caven began his career Penicuik Athletic, before moving to Scottish League First Division club Kilmarnock in February 1957. He made three appearances and scoring one goal during what remained of the 1956–57 season and left the club at the end of the campaign.

Brentford 
Caven followed former Kilmarnock manager Malky McDonald down to England in October 1957 and signed for Third Division South club Brentford. Behind forwards Johnny Rainford, George Francis and Jim Towers in the pecking order, Caven's career with the Bees never got going and he made just seven appearances, scoring one goal, before departing Griffin Park at the end of the 1958–59 season.

Chelmsford City 
After his release from Brentford, Caven dropped into non-league football and had a spell with Southern League Premier Division club Chelmsford City in 1960.

Career statistics

References

1934 births
Living people
Footballers from Edinburgh
Scottish footballers
Brentford F.C. players
English Football League players
Kilmarnock F.C. players
Scottish Football League players
Southern Football League players
Chelmsford City F.C. players
Vale of Leithen F.C. players
Eyemouth United F.C. players
Hawick Royal Albert F.C. players
Penicuik Athletic F.C. players
Association football outside forwards